Brama caribbea, the Caribbean pomfret, is a species of marine ray-finned fish, a pomfret of the family Bramidae. It is found in the Western Atlantic Ocean.

Description
Brama caribbea can be distinguished from congeners through the following characteristics: 
Possessing pectoral fins that are placed high on the body in both juvenile ‘’and’’ adult stages
Having relatively short ventral fins
Possessing fewer than 60 scales in a horizontal series between the gill opening and caudal fin base
Having a total number of vertebrae equaling 38 or fewer (modally 36)
Having 19–21 pectoral fin rays

Distribution
Brama caribbea, appears to be more closely associated with landmasses than its congeners, specifically those associated with the Caribbean (from which its name is derived) and the Northeastern coastal waters of Brazil.

Diet
Brama caribbea consumes a range of food items, but primarily forages for crustaceans (~48% of their diet, largely being  euphausiacids and Brachyscelus crusculum), fishes (28%, primarily  myctophids and Acanthurus species), and cephalopods (15%, including  enoploteuthids and  ommastrephids).

Reproduction
Brama caribbea spawns during the winter, beginning in late August and ending in May, and appears to occur throughout the distribution of the species rather than a central location. However, data are limited.

References

caribbea
Fish described in 1972